Luis Nery Caballero Chamorro (born 22 April 1990) is a Paraguayan footballer who plays as a forward for Deportivo Capiatá of the Paraguayan Primera División B. His father Luis (born 1962) was a member of the Paraguay national football team at the 1986 FIFA World Cup in Mexico.

Career
In the Summer of 2012, Caballero signed a three-year contract with Russian Premier League side Krylya Sovetov. His debut for Krylya Sovetov came on 22 July 2012 in a one all draw at home to Terek Grozny, with Caballero scoring an 82nd-minute penalty for the home side. He ended his first season in Russia scoring 8 league goals in 27 appearances, with another 2 goals coming in Krylya Sovetov's 7-2 aggregate win over Spartak Nalchik in the Relegation play-offs.

Return to Olimpia
On 26 December 2015, it was reported by D10 Paraguay that Caballero would join Club Olimpia Asunción on loan from Club Atlas for a six-month period.

Club statistics

Honours
 Olimpia
 Primera División: 1
 Winner: 2011 Clausura

International goals
Scores and results list Paraguay's goal tally first.

Notes

References

External links

 BDFA profile
 

1990 births
Sportspeople from Asunción
Living people
Paraguayan footballers
Paraguay under-20 international footballers
Paraguay international footballers
Association football forwards
Club Olimpia footballers
PFC Krylia Sovetov Samara players
Atlas F.C. footballers
Club Guaraní players
Club Nacional footballers
Deportivo Santaní players
Deportes Tolima footballers
Sportivo Luqueño players
River Plate (Asunción) footballers
Deportivo Capiatá players
Paraguayan Primera División players
Russian Premier League players
Liga MX players
Categoría Primera A players
Paraguayan expatriate footballers
Expatriate footballers in Russia
Paraguayan expatriate sportspeople in Russia
Expatriate footballers in Mexico
Paraguayan expatriate sportspeople in Mexico
Expatriate footballers in Colombia
Paraguayan expatriate sportspeople in Colombia